Roy André Miljeteig (born 12 June 1988) is a Norwegian football midfielder who currently plays for Vard.

Career
Miljeteig grew up in Aksdal. A late bloomer, he started his senior career in minnows SK Vedavåg while attending upper secondary school in Åkrehamn. The club was relegated from the fourth to the fifth tier. After three seasons in his native Skjold IL, he had a failed stint in Vard in 2010. However, from 2012 to 2015 he was a mainstay in Vard, Haugesund's second best team, and was picked up by FK Haugesund ahead of the 2016 season.

He made his Norwegian Premier League debut in March 2016 against Sarpsborg 08, at the relatively late age of 27.

Miljeteig signed with Vard for the 2019 season.

References

External links
 Profile at Soccerway
 Profile at nifs.no

1988 births
Living people
People from Tysvær
Association football midfielders
Norwegian footballers
SK Vard Haugesund players
FK Haugesund players
Sandnes Ulf players
Egersunds IK players
Norwegian First Division players
Eliteserien players
Sportspeople from Rogaland